Breckenridge Reservoir is a small reservoir on Chopawamsic Creek in Prince William and Stafford counties, Virginia. The reservoir's western shore is the Marine Corps Base Quantico and the eastern shore is a part of Prince William Forest Park, which is a unit of the National Park Service. The reservoir is open to fishing along with a Virginia fishing license and Marine Corps Base Quantico permit. Primitive campsites and a hiking trail are on the Prince William Forest Park side of the reservoir. Reservoir storage volume is approximately 22,500,000 cubic feet (517 acre-feet) with a 
surface area of about 1,820,000 square feet (41.9 acres).

References

External links
National Park Service: Prince William Forest Park

Chesapeake Bay watershed
Protected areas of Prince William County, Virginia
Protected areas of Stafford County, Virginia
Reservoirs in Virginia
Potomac River watershed
Bodies of water of Prince William County, Virginia
Bodies of water of Stafford County, Virginia